The 1569 siege of Kanbara was one of many sieges undertaken by the Takeda clan against the territories of the Hōjō clan during Japan's Sengoku period. 

Takeda Katsuyori, the son of clan head Takeda Shingen, led the siege against Kanbara castle in Suruga province, which was held by a garrison of 1000 men under the command of Hōjō Genan's son, Hōjō Ujinobu. The castle fell on 6 December 1569, and Ujinobu was forced to kill himself.

References

Turnbull, Stephen (1998). 'The Samurai Sourcebook'. London: Cassell & Co.

1569 in Japan
Sieges involving Japan
Battles of the Sengoku period
Conflicts in 1569